Dave Khodabux (born 18 October 1985) is a retired Dutch male badminton player, specializing in doubles play. He won a bronze medal at the 2003 European Junior Badminton Championships with his partner Ruud Bosch in the boys' doubles event.

Achievements

European Junior Championships
Boys' Doubles

BWF International Challenge/Series
Men's Doubles

Mixed Doubles

 BWF International Challenge tournament
 BWF International Series tournament
 BWF Future Series tournament

References

External links
 

1985 births
Living people
Dutch male badminton players